Sakura Station is a name of multiple rail stations in Japan

 Sakura Station (Aichi) in Aichi Prefecture
 Sakura Station (Mie) in Mie Prefecture
 Sakura Station (Chiba) in Chiba Prefecture
 Keisei-Sakura Station in Chiba Prefecture